Ab Baran-e Do (also Romanized as Āb Bārān-e Do; also known as Āb Bārān) is a village in Ab Baran Rural District, Joulaki District, Aghajari County, Khuzestan Province, Iran. At the 2011 census, its population was 1,242 in 270 families.

References 

Populated places in Aghajari County